Russian nationalism is a form of nationalism that promotes Russian cultural identity and unity. Russian nationalism first rose to prominence in the early 19th century, and from its origin in the Russian Empire, to its repression during early Bolshevik rule, and its revival in the Soviet Union, it was closely related to pan-Slavism. 

The definition of Russian national identity within Russian nationalism has been characterized in different ways. In ethnic terms one including asserting that those identified as ethnic Russians are the Russian nation, another is the All-Russian nation concept developed in the Russian Empire that views Russians as having three sub-national groups within it including Great Russians (those commonly identified as ethnic Russians today), Little Russians (Ukrainians), and White Russians (Belarusians). Russian nationalists have identified Russia as the main successor of the Kievan Rus' and typically view the arising of separate national identities of Belarusians and Ukrainians as having broken away from Russian national identity. In a cultural sense Russian national identity has been applied to those within Russian culture that can include ethnic non-Russians who have assimilated through Russification.

History

Imperial Russian nationalism

The Russian motto "Orthodoxy, Autocracy, and Nationality" was coined by Count Sergey Uvarov and it was adopted as the official ideology by Emperor Nicholas I. Three components of Uvarov's triad were:
OrthodoxyOrthodox Christianity and the protection of the Russian Orthodox Church.
Autocracyunconditional loyalty to the House of Romanov in return for paternalist protection for all social estates.
Nationality (has also been translated as national spirit).

The Slavophile movement became popular in 19th-century Russia. Slavophiles opposed the presence of Western European influences in Russia and as a result, they were determined to protect Russian culture and traditions. Aleksey Khomyakov, Ivan Kireyevsky, and Konstantin Aksakov are credited with co-founding the movement.

A notable folk revival in Russian art was loosely related to Slavophilia. Many works concerning Russian history, mythology and fairy tales appeared. Operas by Nikolai Rimsky-Korsakov, Mikhail Glinka and Alexander Borodin; paintings by Viktor Vasnetsov, Ivan Bilibin and Ilya Repin; and poems by Nikolay Nekrasov, Aleksey Konstantinovich Tolstoy, among others, are considered masterpieces of Russian romantic nationalism.

Pan-Slavism, an ideal of unity of all Slavic Orthodox Christian nations, gained popularity in the mid- to late 19th century. One of its major ideologists was Nikolay Danilevsky. Pan-Slavism was fueled by and it was also the fuel for Russia's numerous wars against the Ottoman Empire, which Russia waged with the goal of liberating Orthodox nationalities, such as the Bulgarians, the Romanians, the Serbs and the Greeks, from Muslim rule. The final goal was Constantinople; the Russian Empire still considered itself the "Third Rome" and it believed that its duty required it to succeed the "Second Rome", which was conquered by the Ottoman Empire. Pan-Slavism also played a key role in Russia's entry into World War I, since the 1914 war against Serbia by Austria-Hungary triggered Russia's response.

Early 20th century ultra-nationalism
In the beginning of 20th century, new nationalist and rightist organizations and parties emerged in Russia, such as the Russian Assembly, the Union of the Russian People, the Union of Archangel Michael ("Black Hundreds") and others.

Nationalism during the Soviet era

Under the outlook of international communism that was especially strong at the time, Vladimir Lenin separated patriotism into what he defined as proletarian, socialist patriotism from bourgeois nationalism. Lenin promoted the right of all nations to self-determination and the right to unity of all workers within nations, but he also condemned chauvinism and claimed there were both justified and unjustified feelings of national pride. Lenin explicitly denounced conventional Russian nationalism as "Great Russian chauvinism", and his government sought to accommodate the country's multiple ethnic groups by creating republics and sub-republic units to provide non-Russian ethnic groups with autonomy and protection from Russian domination. Lenin also sought to balance the ethnic representation of leadership of the country by promoting non-Russian officials in the Communist Party of the Soviet Union to counter the large presence of Russians in the Party. However, even at this early period the Soviet government appealed at times to Russian nationalism when it needed support - especially on the Soviet borderlands in the Soviet Union's early years.

Since Russian patriotism served as a legitimizing prop of old order, Bolshevik leaders were anxious to suppress its manifestations and ensure its eventual extinction. They officially discouraged Russian nationalism and remnants of Imperial patriotism, such as the wearing of military awards received before the Civil War. Some of their followers disagreed; in non-Russian territories, Bolshevik power was often regarded as renewed Russian imperialism during 1919 to 1921. In 1922, the Soviet Union was formed with its members combined, but Russia was the largest and most populous member. After 1923 following Lenin's ideas, a policy of korenizatsiya, which provided government support for non-Russian culture and languages within the non-Russian republics, was adopted. However, this policy was not strictly enforced due to domination of Russians in Soviet Union. This domination had been formally criticized in the tsarist empire by Lenin and others as Great Russian chauvinism. Thomas Winderl wrote "The USSR became in a certain sense more a prison-house of nations than the old Empire had ever been. [...] The Russian-dominated center established an inequitable relationship with the ethnic groups it voluntarily helped to construct." Various scholars focused on the nationalist features that already existed during the Leninist period. Korenizatsiya's multinational construction weakened during Stalin. Stalin's policies established a clear shift to Russian nationalism, starting from the idea that Russians were "first among equals" in the Soviet Union, escalating through the "nationalities deportations". According to scholar Jon K. Chang, the Bolsheviks "never made a clean break from Tsarist-era nationalist, populist and primordialist beliefs". Russian historian Andrei Savin stated that Stalin's policy shifted away from internationalism towards National Bolshevism in the 1930s. In a marked change from elimination of the class enemies, the nationality-based repressions declared entire ethnicities counter-revolutionary enemies, although "class dogmas" declaring targeted nationalities to be ideologically opposed to the Soviets were usually added.

Stalin reversed much of his predecessor's previous internationalist policies, signing off on orders for exiling multiple distinct ethnic-linguistic groups brandished as "traitors", including the Balkars, Crimean Tatars, Chechens, Ingush, Karachays, Kalmyks, Koreans, and Meskhetian Turks, who were collectively deported to Siberia or Central Asia, where they were legally designated "special settlers", meaning that they were officially second-class citizens with few rights and were confined within a small perimeter. Various historians see Stalin's deportations of minority and diaspora nationalities as evidence of the Russian nationalism of the Soviet state under Stalin. Chang wrote that the Soviet deportations of Koreans (and other diaspora, deported peoples such as Germans, Finns, Greeks and many others) illustrated that essentialized views of race, that is, primordialism were carried over in whole from the Tsarist era Russian nationalism. These Soviet tropes and biases produced and converted the Koreans (and the Chinese) into a decidedly, un-Marxist Soviet "yellow peril". The racism lay in the fact that others could occasionally be seen or judged by a class line or individually while the Koreans could not. Norman M. Naimark believed that the Stalinist "nationalities deportations" were forms of national-cultural genocide. The deportations at the very least changed the cultures, way of life and world views of the deported peoples as the majority were sent to Soviet Central Asia and Siberia. According to historian Jeremy Smith, "As long as Stalin was alive... nationality policy was subject to arbitrary swings. The most disturbing feature of this period was the growth of official Anti-Semitism" including the campaign against "rootless cosmopolitans". Smith described that "Speeches and newspaper articles raised the spectre of an international Jewish conspiracy to overthrow Soviet power" leading to purges of the Jewish Anti-Fascist Committee and the Doctors' plot associated with the persecution of Jewish Moscow doctors in planned show trials. If Stalin had not died when he did, the Doctors' plot allegedly would have led to the deportation of Jews to Siberia. Meanwhile, the defense of the country during World War II had led to a new wave of national pride emerging in the non-Russian republics which led to purges in those republics.

According to Evgeny Dobrenko, "Late Stalinism" after World War II was the transformation of Soviet society away from Marxism to demonize the idea of cosmopolitanism. He argued that Soviet actions up to 1945 could still in some way be explained by Leninist internationalism, but that the Soviet Union was turned into a Russian nationalist entity during the postwar years. Through a widespread study of Soviet literature, he found a vast increase in nationalist themes, cultural puritanism, and paranoia in publications during this eight year period making "Stalinism the heart of Sovietness" well after Stalin's death. Historian David Brandenberger contrasts russocentrism characteristic of this era with Russian nationalism. In his view, ethnic pride and promoted sense of Russian national identity didn't cross the threshold of nationalism as "the party hierarchy never endorsed the idea of Russian self-determination or separatism and vigorously suppressed all those who did, consciously drawing a line between the positive phenomenon of national identity formation and the malignancy of full-blown nationalist ambitions." To define the "pragmatic" combination of Russian national identity promotion in Marxist-Leninist propaganda and "symbolically abandoned" earlier proletarian internationalism, Brandenberger describes Stalin's regime with the term "National Bolshevism".

The creation of an international communist state under control of the workers was perceived by some as accomplishment of Russian nationalistic dreams. Poet Pavel Kogan described his feelings of the Soviet patriotism just before World War II:

According to Nikolai Berdyaev:		

In 1944, the Soviet Union abandoned its communist anthem The Internationale and adopted a new national anthem conveying a Russian-centered national pride in its first stanza, "An unbreakable union of free republics, Great Russia has sealed forever."

Although Khrushchev had risen up during Stalinism, his speech On the Cult of Personality and Its Consequences and de-Stalinization signified a retreat from official anti-Semitism and Great Russian Chauvinism. Most, though not all nationalities deported by Stalin were allowed to return during Khrushchev, and the Soviet Union to a degree, resumed a policy of cultivating local national developments. Among the nationalities not allowed to return were Koreans and Crimean Tatars. The Kremlin during Khrushchev, generally favoring Russification overall, would attempt several variations of nationalities policy, favoring korenizatsiya (indigenization) in Central Asia without extending privileges to Russians. In Latvia however, regional communist elites tried to reinstate local korenizatsiya 1957-1959, but Khrushchev cracked down on these efforts, exiling Eduards Berklavs, and extended privileges to Russians in Latvia. Nonetheless, during Khrushchev's relatively more tolerant administration, Russian nationalism emerged as a slightly oppositional phenomenon within the Soviet elites. Alexander Shelepin, a Communist Party hardliner and KGB chairman, called for a return to Stalinism and policies more in line with Russian cultural nationalism, as did conservative writers like Sergey Vikulov. The Komsomol leadership also hosted several prominent nationalists such as Sergei Pavlovich Pavlov, an ally of Shelepin, while the Molodaya Gvardiya published numerous neo-Stalinist and nationalist works.

Modern Russian neo-paganism took shape in the second half of the 1970s and is associated with the activities of antisemitic supporters of the Moscow Arabist Valery Yemelyanov (neopagan name - Velemir) and the former dissident and neo-Nazi activist Alexey Dobrovolsky (neopagan name - Dobroslav).

After the dissolution of the Soviet Union

Many nationalist movements, both radical and moderate, have arisen after the dissolution of the Soviet Union. One of the oldest and most popular is Vladimir Zhirinovsky's right-wing populist Liberal Democratic Party of the Soviet Union and then Liberal Democratic Party of Russia, which had been a member of the State Duma since its creation in 1993. Rodina was a popular left-wing nationalist party under Dmitry Rogozin, which eventually abandoned its nationalist ideology and merged with the larger Russian socialist nationalist party A Just Russia.

One of the more radical, ultranationalist movements was Russian National Unity, a far-right group that organised paramilitary brigades of its younger members before it was banned in 1999. Before its breakup in late 2000 the Russian National Unity was estimated to have had approximately 20,000 to 25,000 members. Others include BORN (Militant Organization of Russian Nationalists) which was involved in the murder of Stanislav Markelov, the neo-monarchist Pamyat, the Union of Orthodox Banner-Bearers, and the Movement Against Illegal Immigration, which revived the slogan "Russia for Russians." These parties organised an annual rally called the Russian March.

Extremist nationalism
Extremist nationalism in Russia is used in reference to many far-right and a few far-left ultra-nationalist movements and organizations. In Russia, the term nationalism is frequently used in reference to extremist nationalism. However, it is frequently mixed up with "fascism" in Russia. While the meaning of this terminology does not exactly match the formal definitions of fascism, the common denominator is chauvinism. In all other respects, the positions vary over a wide spectrum. Some movements hold a political position in which they believe that the state must be an instrument of nationalism (such as the National Bolshevik Party, headed by Eduard Limonov), while others (for example, Russian National Unity) promote the use of vigilantist tactics against the perceived "enemies of Russia" without participating in politics.

Historically, the first prototypes of such groups were the Black Hundreds in Imperial Russia, the Russian Fascist Organization and the Russian Fascist Party (two organizations which were based in Manchukuo). More recent antisemitic, white supremacist neo-fascist and neo-Nazi organizations include the Russian National Socialist Party.

In 1997, the Moscow Anti-Fascist Center estimated that 40 (nationalist) extremist groups were operating in Russia. The same source reported 35 extremist newspapers, the largest among these being Zavtra. In spite of repression by governmental authorities, a far-right extremist movement has established itself in 
Russia.

Neo-paganism and the Aryan myth

Since the early 1990s, the Aryan myth has gained great popularity in Russia. Numerous series of collections of works by popularizers of the Aryan idea are published (“Secrets of the Russian Land”, “The True History of the Russian People”, etc.). They are available in Russian bookstores and municipal and university libraries. These works are not marginal: they have a circulation of tens of thousands of copies (or millions, for example, for books by Alexander Asov), their content is involved in the formation of the worldview basis of the general population regarding ancient history.

Authors who develop the Aryan theme are often employees of geopolitical institutions or members of new amateur academies. Only a small number of them have a special historical education. Most of them have education in the field of exact (physical and mathematical) or technical sciences.

The "Aryan" idea in the version of Slavic neo-paganism (the origin of the Slavs from the "Aryans" from Hyperborea or Central Asia, also called the "race of white gods"; the connection of the Slavs with India; ancient pre-Christian Slavic "runic" books; origin from the "Slavic-Aryans" of the ancient civilizations; the neo-pagan symbol "Kolovrat" as an ancient Slavic symbol; a variant of the alien origin of the "Aryan-Hyperboreans") was popularized in the "documentary" programs of one of the most popular Russian federal television channels REN TV (2016, 2017, etc.), including broadcasts by Igor Prokopenko and Oleg Shishkin.

In a number of areas of Russian nationalism, the “Aryan” idea is used to justify the right to the territory of modern Russia or the former Soviet Union, which is declared to be the habitat of the ancient "Slavo-Aryans". In a number of post-Soviet countries, "Aryanism" is cultivated by neo-pagan movements that are not satisfied with the real history of their peoples. The pre-Christian past is idealized, allowing one to present one's ancestors as a great victorious people. The choice falls on paganism, since, according to these ideologists, it is endowed with an "Aryan heroic principle" and is not burdened by Christian morality, calling for mercy and ignoring the idea of the priority of "blood and soil".

Christianity is seen by neo-pagans as a hindrance to a successful "racial struggle". The rejection of Christianity and the return to the "ethnic religion", the "faith of the ancestors", according to neo-pagans, will help overcome the split of the nation and return to it the lost moral "Aryan" values that can lead it out of the crisis. Neo-pagans call for a return to the "Aryan worldview" in the name of public health, which is being destroyed by modern civilization. Within this discourse, the slogans of the Conservative Revolution of the 1920s are once again becoming popular. Declaring themselves "Aryans", the radicals seek to fight for the "salvation of the white race", which results in attacks on "migrants" and other representatives of non-titular nationalities.

In many areas of Slavic neo-paganism (rodnovery), Slavs or Russians are credited with historical and cultural or racial superiority over other peoples. This ideology includes Russian messianism, with the Russian people being considered the only force capable of resisting world evil and leading the rest of the world. The "Aryan" idea sets before Russia the task of building an analogue of the "Fourth Reich", a new "Aryan" empire on a global scale. The Russian Aryan myth rejects any territorial disputes, since the Russian people are depicted as absolutely autochthonous throughout Eurasia.

Less common is the model of an ethno-national state associated with the separatism of certain Russian regions. The fragmentation of Russia into several Russian national states, devoid of ethnic minorities, is supposed. In both cases, it is believed that the cohesion of society in the new state should be built on a single "native faith".

Key people in the development of the Slavo-Aryan myth and Russian neo-paganism include former Soviet dissident Alexey Dobrovolsky (pagan name - Dobroslav), Arabist Valery Yemelyanov (pagan name - Velimir), and writer and dissident Vladimir Danilov.

Contemporary nationalism

The Kremlin conducted a campaign against radical nationalists in the 2010s, and as a result, many of them are currently imprisoned, according to a Russian political scientist and a senior visiting fellow at the George Washington University Institute for European, Russian, and Eurasian Studies Maria Lipman.

Sociologist Marcel Van Herpen wrote that United Russia increasingly relied on Russian nationalism for support following the 2014 Russian military intervention in Ukraine. Nationalist political party Rodina cultivated ties with Eurosceptic, far-right and far-left political movements, supporting them financially and inviting them to Eurasian conferences in Crimea and Saint Petersburg.

However, the Kremlin scaled nationalism down out of fears that prominent figures such as Igor Girkin began to act independently, following a brief period of stirring activism that resulted in Russian men volunteering to fight in Donbas in 2014 and 2015, according to Lipman. In Lipman's view, the Kremlin's aim is to prevent emotions that "might get out of control and motivate people to act independently".

Academics Robert Horvath and Anton Shekhovtsov described how the Kremlin uses far-right groups to promote Russian nationalist or anti-western views in Russia and abroad. According to Horvath, the Kremlin cultivated neo-Nazis who reject democratic institutions and imposed restrictions on mainstream nationalists who may support free elections. 

In November 2018, Vladimir Putin described himself as "the most effective nationalist", explaining that Russia is a multiethnic and multireligious state and preserving it as such serves the interests of the ethnic Russians. He remarked that Russian ethnicity didn't exist at some point and it was formed by multiple Slavic tribes.

According to Michael Hirsh, a senior correspondent at Foreign Policy:

Russian nationalism and ethnic minorities

The issue of Russian nationalism with regard to Russia's relationship with its ethnic minorities has been extensively studied since the rapid expansion of Russia from the 16th century onward. Since there is no English word which differentiates the meaning of the word "Russian", in Russian, it is either used as a term for an ethnic people ("Русский" – ethnic Russian) and it is also used as a term for the inhabitants of Russia ("Россиянин" – Russian citizen).

The Russian conquest of Muslim Kazan is considered the first event which transformed Russia from a nearly homogenous nation into a multi-ethnic society. Over the years and from the territorial base which it gained in Kazan, Russia managed to conquer Siberia and Manchuria and it also expanded into the Caucasus. At one point, Russia managed to annex a large territory of Eastern Europe, Finland, Central Asia, Mongolia and, on other occasions, it encroached into Turkish, Chinese, Afghan and Iranian territories. Various ethnic minorities have become increasingly viral and integrated into mainstream Russian society, and as a result, they have created a mixing picture of racial relationships in the modern Russian nationalist mindset. The work of understanding different ethnic minorities in relation to the Russian state can be traced back to the work of Philip Johan von Strahlenberg, a Swedish prisoner of war who settled in Tsarist Russia and became a geographer.

The concept is strongly understood by various minorities in Russia. The Volga Tatars and the Bashkirs, the two main Muslim peoples in Russia, have long been lauded as model minorities in Russia, and historically, they have been viewed more positively by the Russian nationalist movement. Furthermore, Tatar and Bashkir imams have worked to spread the Russian nationalist ideology in a way which is in accordance with their Islamic faith.

In the Caucasus, Russia gained a significant amount of support from the Ossetians, one of the few Christian-based peoples which live in the mountainous region. There was also a strong amount of support for Russia among Armenians and Greeks, a sentiment which was largely due to the fact that the Armenians, the Greeks and the Orthodox government of Russia all adhered to similar religions.

The Koryo-saram (Koreans) have also been regarded as a model minority in Russia, and as a result, they have been encouraged to colonize sparsely-populated parts of Russia, this policy was first implemented during the Tsarist era and it continues to be implemented today, because Koreans were not hostile to Russian nationalism. Although the Korean diaspora in the Russian Far East was loyal to the Soviet Union and also underwent cultural Russification, Koreans were deported to Central Asia by the Soviet government (1937–1938), based on the erroneous charge that they were aligned with the Japanese. When Khrushchev allowed deported nationalities to return to their homelands, the Koreans remained restricted and they were not rehabilitated. On 26April 1991 the Supreme Soviet of the Russian Socialist Federal Soviet Republic, under its chairman Boris Yeltsin, passed the law On the Rehabilitation of Repressed Peoples with Article 2 denouncing all mass deportations as "Stalin's policy of defamation and genocide".

Ukrainians in Russia have been largely integrated and the majority of them pledged loyalty over Russia, while some Ukrainians managed to occupy significant positions in Russian history. Bohdan Khmelnytsky is one of Russia's most celebrated figures who brought Ukraine to the Tsardom of Russia throughout the Pereyaslav Council. Ukrainian Prince Alexander Bezborodko was responsible for manifesting the modern diplomacies of Russia under the reign of Catherine the Great. Soviet leaders Nikita Khrushchev, Konstantin Chernenko and Mikhail Gorbachev also had some ancestral connections to Ukraine. In addition, Russia's biggest opposition leader, Alexei Navalny, is also of paternally of Ukrainian origin as well as being a potential Russian nationalist.

Akhmad Kadyrov and his son Ramzan defected to Russia during the Second Chechen War, pledging loyalty to Russia following the fear of Wahhabi takeover in Chechnya. Vladislav Surkov, who is of Chechen origin, was the chief figure who initiated the idea of Russian managed democracy, in which nationalism is a part of the ideology.

Georgians in Russia do not have a positive view of Russian nationalism, and as a result, some of them maintain a neutral or negative opinion. However, Russian expansion into the Caucasus mountains has been driven by Georgian figures such as Pavel Tsitsianov, who initiated the conquest of the Caucasus. Pyotr Bagration was another Georgian who went on to become one of Russia's most celebrated heroes. Soviet Union's transformation into a superpower was the work of yet another Russified Georgian, Joseph Stalin, who had a complex relationship with Russian nationalism.

Some of Dagestan's revered figures have long been respected by Russian nationalists, such as Rasul Gamzatov, who is one of Russia's most respected poets despite his Avar origin. Khabib Nurmagomedov's rise to popularity and fame has earned a divisive opinion among Russians and Dagestanis. Many Dagestanis supported Russia against Chechnya, during the previous Caucasian War when the Dagestanis found Chechens incapable to obey and follow order, and during the Second Chechen War, owning by Chechen expansionist attempt to conquer Dagestan in 1999.

Germans in Russia have long been treated with privileges under the Tsarist government and many Germans became prominent in Russian politics, education and economy, including the Tsarist House of Romanov, which also included many German-based figures, most notably Catherine the Great. Many Germans fought in the Russian Civil War and regarded themselves as Russian nationalists. The Baltic German nobility were significantly loyal to the Russian Empire, but were resistant to nationalism until the Russian Revolution, identifying mainly as members of the Russian nobility.

Parties and organizations

 Black Hundreds early 20th century (Defunct)
 Mladorossi (Defunct)
 Union of the Russian People (Defunct)
 Russian Fascist Party (Defunct)

See also

 All-Russian nation
 Moscow, third Rome
 Putinism
 Russian Fascist Organization
 Russian Fascist Party
 Russia for Russians
 Russian imperialism
 Russian world
 Russification
 Russophilia

Bibliography

English
 Afzal, Amina. Resurgence of Russian Nationalism. Strategic Studies 27, no. 4 (2007): 53–65. 
 Aitamurto, Kaarina. Paganism, Traditionalism, Nationalism: Narratives of Russian Rodnoverie. London : Routledge, 2016.
 Blanc, Eric. Revolutionary Social Democracy: Working-Class Politics Across the Russian Empire. Haymarket Books, 2022.
 Bojanowska, Edyta M. Nikolai Gogol: Between Ukrainian and Russian Nationalism. Cambridge: Harvard University Press, 2007.
 Bojcun, Marko. The Workers Movement and the National Question in Ukraine 1897-1918. Leiden : Brill, 2021.
 Brudny, Yitzhak M. Reinventing Russia: Russian Nationalism and the Soviet State, 1953–1991. Cambridge: Harvard University Press, 1999
 Cosgrove, S. (2004). Russian Nationalism and the Politics of Soviet Literature: The Case of Nash Sovremennik, 1981–1991. New York: Palgrave Macmillan.
 Druzhnikov, Yuri. Prisoner of Russia: Alexander Pushkin and the Political Uses of Nationalism. New Brunswick: Routledge, 1999.
 Duncan, Peter J. S. (March 2005). "Contemporary Russian Identity between East and West". The Historical Journal. 48(1): 277–294.
 Dunlop, J. B., The Faces of Contemporary Russian Nationalism. Princeton: Princeton University Press, 1983.
 Dunlop, J. B., The New Russian Nationalism, Praeger, 1985* Ely, Christopher, Jonathan Smele, and Michael Melancon. Russian Populism: A History. New York: Bloomsbury Academic, 2022.
 Frolova-Walker, Marina. Russian Music and Nationalism: From Glinka to Stalin. New Haven: Yale University Press, 2008.
 Helmers, Rutger. Not Russian Enough?: Nationalism and Cosmopolitanism in Nineteenth-Century Russian Opera. Rochester: University of Rochester Press, 2014.
 Hillis, Faith. Children of Rus’: Right-Bank Ukraine and the Invention of a Russian Nation. Ithaca: Cornell University Press, 2013.
 Horvath, Robert. Putin’s Fascists: Russkii Obraz and the Politics of Managed Nationalism in Russia. New York: Routledge, 2020.
 Kolstø, Pål, and Helge Blakkisrud, eds. The New Russian Nationalism: Imperialism, Ethnicity and Authoritarianism 2000–2015. Edinburgh University Press, 2016.
 Laqueur, Walter. Russian Nationalism. Foreign Affairs 71, no. 5 (1992): 103–16. 
 Laruelle, Marlène. Russian Eurasianism: An Ideology of Empire. Washington, D.C.: Baltimore: Johns Hopkins University Press, 2008.
 Laruelle, Marlene. Russian Nationalism: Imaginaries, Doctrines, and Political Battlefields. London: Routledge, 2018.
 Pipes, Richard. The Formation of the Soviet Union: Communism and Nationalism, 1917-1923. Cambridge: Harvard University Press, 1964.
 Plokhy, Serhii. Lost Kingdom: The Quest for Empire and the Making of the Russian Nation. New York: Basic Books, 2017.
 Riasanovsky, Nicholas V. Nicholas I and Official Nationality in Russia 1825–1855. Berkeley: University of California Press, 1959.
 Shenfield, Stephen D. Russian Fascism: Traditions, Tendencies, Movements. London: Routledge, 2000.* Sablin, Ivan. The Rise and Fall of Russia’s Far Eastern Republic, 1905–1922: Nationalisms, Imperialisms, and Regionalisms in and after the Russian Empire. London: Routledge, 2018.
 Simon, Gerhard. Nationalism and Policy Toward the Nationalities in the Soviet Union: From Totalitarian Dictatorship to Post-Stalinist Society. Translated by Karen Forster and Oswald Forster. London: Routledge, 2019.
 Sinyavsky, Andrey, and Dale E. Peterson. Russian Nationalism. The Massachusetts Review 31, no. 4 (1990): 475–94.
 Strickland, John. The Making of Holy Russia: The Orthodox Church and Russian Nationalism Before the Revolution. Jordanville: The Printshop of St Job of Pochaev, 2013.
 Tuminez, Astrid S. Russian Nationalism since 1856: Ideology and the Making of Foreign Policy Lanham: Rowman & Littlefield Publishers, 2000.
 Verkhovsky, Alexander (December 2000). "Ultra-nationalists in Russia at the onset of Putin's rule". Nationalities Papers. 28(4): 707–722. 
 Wegren, Stephen K. Putin’s Russia. Eighth edition. Lanham: Rowman & Littlefield Publishers, 2022.
 Wegren, Stephen K. Putin’s Russia: Past Imperfect, Future Uncertain. Seventh edition. Lanham: Rowman & Littlefield Publishers, 2018.

Russian
 , 2002
  Радикальный национализм в России: проявления и противодействие Центр экстремальной журналистики.

References

External links

 Nationalism and xenophobia in Russia , SOVA Center, an independent authority that produces reports and daily updates on the rise of nationalism and xenophobia in the Russian Federation
 Ultra-nationalist, fascist and neo-Nazi movements in Russia Infoshop News
 Western Perceptions of Russian Nationalism (or this link)
 Russian Nationalism and Putin's Russia
 On menace of nationalism in Russia. "Yabloko" Party view (in Russian)
 Vladislav Kelle. Nationalism and the future of Russia (in Russian)
 Racial violence escalates in Russia Jane's Intelligence Review, 5 September 2006
 National Socialist Society Radical national socialist organization
 Nordrus – an organization of "Russian radical nationalists" (in Russian)
 "Velvet" Fascism. Ultra-nationalist ideas are popular among the literary mainstream and political saloons by Andrey Kolesnikov
 Russian Fascism and Russian Fascists by Kirill Buketov
 Radical nationalism in Russia and efforts to counteract it in 2006

 
Politics of Russia